This is a list of airports in Alberta. It includes all Nav Canada certified and registered water and land  airports, aerodromes and heliports in the Canadian province of Alberta.



List of airports and heliports
The list is sorted by the name of the community served; click the sort buttons in the table header to switch listing order.

Defunct airports

See also

 List of airports in the Calgary area
 List of airports in the Edmonton Metropolitan Region
 List of airports in the Fort McMurray area
 List of airports in the Lethbridge area
 List of airports in the Red Deer area

Notes

References 

 
Alberta
Airports